Warren Adam Furman (born 3 July 1972) is a British actor and television presenter who is best known for his role of Ace on the British TV show Gladiators from 1996 to 2000. He is open about steroid abuse on the show.

He dated Katie Price (formerly known as Jordan) in the late 1990s.

After Gladiators he worked as a construction manager.

He became a born-again Christian, and preaches in schools.

References

External links
 The Gladiators Zone – Ace

1972 births
Living people
Gladiators (1992 British TV series)
Actors from Doncaster
Television personalities from South Yorkshire
English Christians